Pasi Arvonen (born February 5, 1968) is a Finnish ice hockey coach. He is currently the head coach for HPK of the Finnish Liiga.

On October 14, 2013, Arvonen replaced Kai Rautio to take over the head coaching duties for HPK.

References

External links
Pasi Arvonen's profile at Eliteprospects.com

1968 births
Living people
Finnish ice hockey coaches
People from Hämeenlinna
Sportspeople from Kanta-Häme